Spellbound is an upcoming computer-animated musical fantasy film directed by Vicky Jenson from a screenplay by Linda Woolverton, Lauren Hynek and Elizabeth Martin with music composed by Alan Menken, who wrote the songs with longtime collaborator Glenn Slater. Produced by Skydance Animation, the film features the voices of Rachel Zegler, Nicole Kidman, Javier Bardem, John Lithgow, Jenifer Lewis, and Nathan Lane. Set in the world of magic known as Lumbria, the story follows Princess Ellian (Zegler), a young girl who must the break the spell that split her kingdom in two. The film is set to be released on Apple TV+.

The project, entitled Split, was announced in July 2017, shortly after Skydance Animation was formed in March 2017, with Paramount Pictures scheduling distribution for 2019. The film subsequently underwent changes, such as release dates, with Jenson later announced as the director, and the film's title changed to The Unbreakable Spell, before eventually to its current title. Much of the main voice cast signed in June 2022, following Zegler's casting in April 2022. Production was done remotely during the COVID-19 pandemic.

Premise 
The story is set in a world of magic known as Lumbria where a young girl, Ellian, must break the spell that has split her kingdom in two.

Voice cast 
 Rachel Zegler as Princess Ellian
 Nicole Kidman as Queen Ellsmere
 Javier Bardem as King Solon
 John Lithgow as Minister Bolinar
 Jenifer Lewis as Minister Nazara Prone
 Nathan Lane as The Oracle of the Sun
 André De Shields as The Oracle of the Moon
 Jordan Fisher as Callan

Production

Development 
On March 16, 2017, Skydance Media formed a multi-year partnership with Madrid-based animation studio Ilion Animation Studios, forming an animation division called Skydance Animation. In July, it announced Split, and it was revealed by Skydance Media CEO David Ellison that Linda Woolverton was writing the film. It would be distributed by Paramount Pictures as part of their deal with Skydance Media and was given a release date for sometime in 2019. Following John Lasseter's hiring as CCO of Skydance Animation, then-chief of Paramount Animation Mirielle Soria announced that Paramount Animation would end its informal work with Skydance.

On April 2, 2020, composer Alan Menken revealed that he was working alongside John Lasseter on a project for the studio, which was later announced to be Split, which by then was renamed to The Unbreakable Spell before it became Spellbound. The film will be directed by Vicky Jenson, from a screenplay by Lauren Hyne, Elizabeth Martin and Woolverton, with songs by Menken and longtime collaborator Glenn Slater. In July 2020, it was announced that Spellbound was still going to be released by Paramount Pictures without Paramount Animation until Apple TV+ acquired the distribution rights to it in December 2020 as part of a larger pact with Skydance Animation. Apple Original Films would replace Paramount as a production company.

Casting 
In April 2022, Rachel Zegler was cast as the lead character. In June, Nicole Kidman, Javier Bardem, John Lithgow, Nathan Lane, Jenifer Lewis, André De Shields, and Jordan Fisher were added to the cast.

Animation 
Animation has been provided by Skydance Animation Madrid with portions of production done remotely during the COVID-19 pandemic.

Release 
On March 16, 2017, it was reported that the original release was intended to be in 2019. On July 20, 2020, Paramount Pictures dated the film for November 11, 2022. On December 16, 2020, Apple TV+ entered talks to take over the distribution rights to the film, retaining its November 11 date. However, as of March 2023, it is currently undated.

Marketing 
On March 22, 2022, it was reported that Skydance Animation made a multi-year deal with Spin Master Entertainment to make toys based on the film.

References

External links 

Upcoming films
Upcoming English-language films
American adventure comedy films
American fantasy comedy films
American musical fantasy films
American children's animated comedy films
American children's animated fantasy films
American children's animated musical films
American computer-animated films
Animated films about magic
Apple TV+ original films
English-language Spanish films
Films directed by Vicky Jenson
Films impacted by the COVID-19 pandemic
Films not released in theaters due to the COVID-19 pandemic
Films produced by John Lasseter
Films scored by Alan Menken
Films with screenplays by Linda Woolverton
Skydance Media films
Skydance Animation films
Spanish fantasy comedy films
Spanish computer-animated films
Spanish fantasy films
Spanish musical films